Orono may refer to:

Places
Oroño Boulevard, Rosario, Santa Fe Province, Argentina
Orono, Ontario, Canada, a town in the Municipality of Clarington

United States
Orono, Maine, a town in Penobscot County, home to the University of Maine
Orono (CDP), Maine, the main settled area of the town
Orono, Minnesota, a city in Hennepin County
Orono Township, Muscatine County, Iowa

People
Dumas Oroño (1921–2005), Uruguayan artist
Joseph Orono (1688–1738), Penobscot Indian chief
Nicasio Oroño (1825–1904), Argentine politician and lawyer
Rafael Orono (born 1958), Venezuelan boxer
Orono Wor Petchpun (born 1978), Thai kickboxer and mixed martial artist
Orono Noguchi, member of Superorganism (band)

Other uses
 Hedone orono, a butterfly of family Hesperiidae